The glossy-backed drongo (Dicrurus divaricatus) is a species of bird in the family Dicruridae. It occurs in sub-Saharan Africa from south Mauritania and Senegambia across to Somalia and northern Kenya. 

The glossy-backed drongo was described by the German naturalist Hinrich Lichtenstein in 1823 from a specimen obtained in Senegambia. He coined the binomial name Muscicapa divaricata. It was formerly treated as a subspecies of the fork-tailed drongo (Dicrurus adsimilis) but it is now considered as a separate species based on the phylogenetic relationships determined in a molecular study published in 2018.

There are two subspecies:
 D. d. divaricatus (Lichtenstein, MHK, 1823) – Senegambia and south Mauritania to southwest Chad
 D. d. lugubris (Hemprich & Ehrenberg, 1828) – south Chad to Eritrea, Ethiopia, north Kenya, and north Somalia

References

glossy-backed drongo
glossy-backed drongo